Donovan Bailey   (born December 16, 1967) is a retired Jamaican-Canadian sprinter. He once held the world record for the 100 metres.  He recorded a time of 9.84 seconds to win the gold medal at the 1996 Olympic Games. He was the first Canadian to legally break the 10-second barrier in the 100 m. Particularly noted for his top speed, Bailey ran  in his 1996 Olympic title run, the fastest ever recorded by a human at the time. He was inducted into Canada's Sports Hall of Fame in 2004 as an individual athlete and in 2008 as part of the 1996 Summer Olympics 4x100 relay team. In 2005, he was also inducted into the Ontario Sports Hall of Fame.

Early life
Donovan Anthony Bailey was born in Manchester Parish, Jamaica on December 16, 1967, as the fourth of five sons to George and Daisy Bailey. Before going to Mount Olivet Primary School, he would take care of his family's chickens, goats, and pigs. Donovan was fast when he was a young boy, with his former teacher Claris Lambert recounting that "He showed his athletic skills from grade one. He always came first in races."

Bailey immigrated to Canada at age 12 and played basketball before graduating from Queen Elizabeth Park High School in Oakville, Ontario. During high school, his brother, O'Neil, won 4 Ontario Provincial titles in the long jump. Bailey was exceptionally fast as well, clocking 10.65 seconds in the 100m at the age of 16. However, his main interest was in basketball. After graduating in June 1984, Bailey attended Sheridan College, for which he played basketball during the 1986–1987 school year. He graduated from Sheridan with a degree in Business Administration. Bailey then began working as a property and marketing consultant for an importing and exporting clothing company.

Career

Early career
It was only in 1990 that Bailey decided to begin racing professionally; after watching the 1990 Canadian Track and Field Championships, he realized that most of the men competing were men he had beaten in high school. He began training as a 100m sprinter part-time, while working as a stockbroker. In 1991, he won the 60 metres at the Ontario Indoor Championships, and at the 1991 Pan American Games in Havana, Cuba, Bailey anchored Canada's 4 × 100 metres relay team, to a silver medal. In 1992, Bailey finished second in the 100m at the national championships.

From 1993 to 1994, he competed for Fenerbahçe Athletics. American coach Dan Pfaff, who coached Bailey's high school friend Glenroy Gilbert at Louisiana State University and listened to Bailey's complaints, was impressed by Bailey's performances considering his terrible form and fitness. Pfaff invited Bailey to train with him and Gilbert at LSU, and with just 3 months of training together, Bailey shaved 3 tenths of a second off of his 100m personal best; his time of 10.03 seconds was the third fastest in Canadian history.

1995: Breakthrough
On April 22, 1995, Bailey made history by breaking the 10-second barrier for the first time in the 100m, becoming the 18th man and 2nd Canadian to legally do so. His time of 9.99 seconds was just 4 hundredths shy of Ben Johnson's record of 9.95. In July, he broke Johnson's record with 9.91 at the national championships, the fastest time of the year, effectively asserting his name as a favorite for the gold medal at the World Championships in Gothenburg later that year.

1996: Olympic History
With a world title now under his belt, Bailey was highly considered to be a favorite for the Olympic title in Atlanta that July. As a precursor to the centennial Olympics, Bailey broke the indoor 50 m world record during a competition in Reno, Nevada in 1996. He was timed at 5.56 seconds. Maurice Greene later matched that performance in 1999, but his run was never ratified as a world record.

Bailey was officially selected to represent Canada at the 1996 Summer Olympics after winning his 3rd consecutive national title in the 100m. On July 27, after a very disrupted start to the race, Bailey won the Olympic 100m title setting a new world record of 9.84 seconds. During the race, he hit a top speed of 12.10 m/s (43.6 km/h or 27.1 mph), which was the fastest top speed ever recorded by a human being at the time. Many Canadians felt Bailey's victory restored the image of Canadian athletes, after the exposure of Ben Johnson's history of doping. At the time, Bailey was only the second person after Carl Lewis to hold all the major titles in the 100m concurrently (World Champion, Olympic Champion & World Record Holder). 6 days later, he completed the 100m/ double once again, anchoring Canada to their first ever Olympic  title in a national record of 37.69 seconds.

Rivalry with Michael Johnson
After the end of the 1996 Summer Olympics, American Sportscaster Bob Costas claimed that 200m Gold medalist Michael Johnson was faster than Bailey Because Johnson's 200m time (19.32 Seconds) divided by 2 (9.66 Seconds) was shorter than Bailey's 100m time (9.84). This started a debate on whether Johnson or Bailey was the real "World's Fastest Man", which in turn resulted in a 150m race between the two, in which Bailey won after Johnson injured his hamstring.

1997 World Championships
At the 1997 World Championships in Athens, Bailey attempted to defend his 100m title, but was beaten by Maurice Greene and was forced to settle for the silver medal in 9.91 seconds. However, along with his Canadian teammates, he was able to defend Canada's  title in 37.86 seconds, the fastest time of the year. One of his last meets of the season was at the ISTAF Berlin; after finishing 2nd in the 100m, Bailey ran the first leg of the "Dream Team II" in the  relay: Carl Lewis' last race of his career. With Leroy Burrell on the 2nd leg, Frankie Fredericks on the 3rd, and Lewis on the anchor, the team won in 38.24 seconds, a meeting record.

1998 Goodwill Games
Bailey and the 4 x 100 metre Canadian relay team won a silver medal with a time of 38.23 at the 1998 Goodwill Games in New York, finishing behind the United States.  Bailey ruptured his Achilles tendon while playing basketball during the post season of 1998, which effectively began the end of his athletics career.

1999 Pan American Games and World Championships
Bailey won a silver medal with the Canadian 4 x 100 metre relay team with a time of 38.49 at the 1999 Pan American Games in Winnipeg, finishing behind Brazil.  The silver medal matched his first international medal he won eight years earlier at the 1991 Pan American Games in the 4 x 100 metre relay and it would be his final international medal.  Bailey was part of the Canadian 4 x 100 metre relay team at the  1999 World Championships in Seville but the team was disqualified in the first round of heats.

2000 Summer Olympics and 2001 World Championships
He made a second attempt in the 2000 Summer Olympics, but suffered from pneumonia and dropped out during the rounds. He retired from the sport in 2001 after the World Championships in Edmonton, having been a three-time World and 2 time Olympic champion.

Post-retirement
After racing, Bailey started his own company called DBX Sport Management which helps amateur athletes find a way to promote themselves.  He also started a sport injury clinic in Oakville, Ontario.

He has been inducted into Canada's Sports Hall of Fame twice: in 2004 as an individual, and in 2008 as part of the 1996 Summer Olympics 4 × 100 relay team.

In August 2008 Bailey began work as a track commentator for CBC Television at the 2008 Summer Olympics. He estimated that had Usain Bolt not slowed down near the end of the 100m dash (which he still won in record time), he could have set a time of 9.55 seconds. He returned as the track analyst for CBC's coverage of the 2016 Summer Olympics.

In 2010, Bailey was one of the recipients of the Top 25 Canadian Immigrant Awards presented by Canadian Immigrant Magazine.

In 2014, Bailey pleaded guilty to a drinking and driving charge from 2012. This was the third driving-related incident for Bailey. In 1998 he crashed his car into a concrete utility pole and was fined $200 for failing to report an accident. In 2001, Bailey was fined $975 for driving 200 km/h on a 100 km/h road in Toronto.

In 2016, he was made a member of the Order of Ontario. In 2017, Canada's Walk of Fame honoured him with a star.

In 2018, it was reported that Bailey had provided his entire athlete's trust of $3.75 million to Aird & Berlis lawyer Stuart Bollefer, who invested it in what was determined to be a tax evasion scheme by the Canadian government. Bailey lost the full amount due to the scheme, however the courts ordered Aird & Berlis to pay all outstanding taxes due to their negligence.

In 2022, Bailey was named an officer to the Order of Canada.

Personal bests

See also
 Canadian records in track and field
 World record progression 100 metres men

References

External links

 
 
 
 
 
 
 

1967 births
Living people
Canadian male sprinters
Track and field athletes from Ontario
Fenerbahçe athletes
People from Manchester Parish
Sportspeople from Oakville, Ontario
Black Canadian track and field athletes
Jamaican emigrants to Canada
Naturalized citizens of Canada
World record setters in athletics (track and field)
Olympic track and field athletes of Canada
Olympic gold medalists for Canada
Commonwealth Games medallists in athletics
Medalists at the 1996 Summer Olympics
Athletes (track and field) at the 1996 Summer Olympics
Athletes (track and field) at the 2000 Summer Olympics
World Athletics Championships medalists
Commonwealth Games gold medallists for Canada
Athletes (track and field) at the 1994 Commonwealth Games
Pan American Games silver medalists for Canada
Athletes (track and field) at the 1991 Pan American Games
Athletes (track and field) at the 1999 Pan American Games
Lou Marsh Trophy winners
Sheridan College alumni
World Athletics Championships athletes for Canada
Olympic gold medalists in athletics (track and field)
Pan American Games medalists in athletics (track and field)
World Athletics indoor record holders
Members of the Order of Ontario
Goodwill Games medalists in athletics
World Athletics Championships winners
Competitors at the 1998 Goodwill Games
Medalists at the 1991 Pan American Games
Medalists at the 1999 Pan American Games
Officers of the Order of Canada
Medallists at the 1994 Commonwealth Games